Carol Ann Coslett (born 18 August 1963) is a British Anglican priest. From 2018 until 2023, she served as an archdeacon in the Church of England's Diocese of Derby: as Archdeacon of Chesterfield until 2022, then as Archdeacon of Derbyshire Peak and Dales.

Coslett was educated at Bangor University and Ripon College Cuddesdon.  After a curacy in Horsell she was Rector of Betchworth until her appointment as archdeacon.

Coslett resigned her archdeaconry during February 2023.

References

1963 births
21st-century Anglican priests
Archdeacons of Chesterfield
Alumni of Bangor University
Alumni of Ripon College Cuddesdon
Living people
Women Anglican clergy